Eucyclodes is a genus of moths in the family Geometridae. According to Catalogue of Life recent revision, only E. buprestaria is included to the genus. Other species are categorized into Chloromachia.

Species
 Chloromachia albiceps Felder, 1875
 Eucyclodes absona (Warren, 1896) = Anisozyga absona
 Eucyclodes albisparsa (Walker, 1861) = Chloromachia albisparsa
 Eucyclodes aphrias (Meyrick, 1889) = Anisozyga aphrias
 Chloromachia augustaria Oberthür, 1916
 Chloromachia aureofulva Warren, 1897 
 Osteosema discata (Prout) - ssp. benguetensis
 Eucyclodes buprestaria (Guenée, 1857)
 Eucyclodes caledonica (Thierry-Mieg, 1915)
 Eucyclodes callisticta (Turner, 1904)
 Eucyclodes charma (Prout, 1917)
 Chloromachia concinnata Pagenstecher, 1888 
 Eucyclodes difficta (Walker, 1861)
 Eucyclodes discipennata (Walker, 1861)
 Eucyclodes divapala (Walker, 1861)
 Eucyclodes erotyla Turner, 1910
 Eucyclodes erymnodes Turner, 1910
 Eucyclodes fascinans (Lucas, 1894)
 Eucyclodes gavissima (Walker, 1861) = Anisozyga gavissima
 Eucyclodes goniota (Lower, 1894)
 Chloromachia infracta Wileman, 191? 
 Eucyclodes insperata (Walker, 1861)
 Eucyclodes lepta (West)
 Eucyclodes leptocosma (Prout, 1933)
 Eucyclodes lithocrossa (Meyrick, 1889)
 Eucyclodes metaspila (Walker, 1861)
 Eucyclodes nivestrota (Warren, 1907)
 Eucyclodes picturata (Hampson 1903)
 Eucyclodes pieroides (Walker, 1861)
 Eucyclodes praeampla (Warren, 1897)
 Chloromachia pulchella Warren, 1899 
 Eucyclodes rufimargo (Warren, 1897) = Chloromachia rufimargo
 Eucyclodes sanguilineata (Moore, [1868])
 Eucyclodes semialba (Walker, 1861) - ssp. Eucyclodes angiportus
 Eucyclodes speciosa (Lucas, 1890)
 Eucyclodes textiloides Holloway, 1996
 Eucyclodes vicaria (Herbulot)

References

 Eucyclodes at Markku Savela's Lepidoptera and Some Other Life Forms
 Natural History Museum Lepidoptera genus database

Geometrinae
Geometridae genera